Alexander Jonathan Lawther (born 4 May 1995) is an English actor. He made his professional acting debut originating the role of John Blakemore in Sir David Hare's South Downs in the West End. He made his feature film debut playing a young Alan Turing in the Academy Award-winning film The Imitation Game (2014), for which he received the London Film Critics' Circle Award for "Young British Performer of the Year" and was declared one of BAFTA's 2015 Breakthrough Brits.

He achieved more mainstream success for his role as Kenny in "Shut Up and Dance", an episode of the Netflix anthology series Black Mirror (2016), and for portraying the lead role of James in the Channel 4 series The End of the F***ing World (2017–2019). His other notable work includes his roles in Freak Show, Howards End, Goodbye Christopher Robin, Ghost Stories, The Last Duel and Star Wars: Andor. On screen, he is known for his frequent portrayals of outsiders and eccentric characters.

Early life
Lawther was born in Winchester, Hampshire and raised in Petersfield. He is of English and Irish descent, possessing dual British and Irish citizenship through his Northern Irish father. The son of two lawyers (Yvonne Lawther; Michael Terrence), Lawther has described himself as having come from a "white middle-class bubble". As the youngest of three children, he said that his aspiration to be an actor came from having to make up his own games to entertain himself as a child.  Both of his siblings live and work in the United States, with his older brother, Cameron Lawther, being an award-winning Hollywood film producer, and his older sister Ellie Lawther working in public policy.

Lawther was educated at Churcher's College, a selective independent school in the British public school tradition. While at Churcher's, Lawther was  heavily involved in the drama programme, where he played Ratty in The Wind in the Willows, Sir Toby Belch in Twelfth Night, and Lucas in The Third Bank of the River. He was awarded the Sir Daniel Day-Lewis Award by the Petersfield Town Council. In 2009, a fourteen-year-old Lawther was allowed to write and direct his own full-length play based on a song by Sara Bareilles entitled Rejected Fairytales as part of his drama club involvement, where he received laudatory coverage in the local press as a "theatrical whiz kid".

In 2010, he was accepted into the prestigious National Youth Theatre, where he received his training as an actor. He also collaborated with his brother as an actor on his short film The Fear, made when the elder Lawther was applying to film school. He did not study drama at GCSE or A level. He initially planned to read History at King's College London, but ultimately gave up his place after being cast in The Imitation Game; instead, he moved to London at 18 to pursue acting professionally.

Career

2011–2016: South Downs, The Imitation Game, Departure and early roles 
Lawther's professional debut came at the age of 16, when he appeared as John Blakemore in Sir David Hare's South Downs at Chichester Festival Theatre. Lawther found out about an open audition for the play through his school, as the casting directors were scouting real students attending elite private schools in the South Downs for the play's public school setting. He travelled to London, where he beat hundreds of other young actors for the lead role. After a local trial run, the play then went to the West End, where he performed the role at the Harold Pinter Theatre in sold out runs whilst still studying for his A Levels. He received critical acclaim for his performance and, having previously viewed acting as only a hobby, he was encouraged to pursue a career in film and theatre. Shortly thereafter, he signed a contract with a film agent.

Following his performance in South Downs, Lawther spent much of his early career playing wealthy English schoolboys. After several small television roles, he portrayed Benjamin Britten as a schoolboy in the television docudrama by Tony Britten, Benjamin Britten: Peace and Conflict (2013), also featuring John Hurt as the narrator. Lawther received his breakthrough film role as a young Alan Turing during his time at the Sherborne School in the Academy Award-winning film The Imitation Game (2014), with Benedict Cumberbatch portraying the older Turing. The role won him the London Film Critics' Circle Award for "Young British Performer of the Year". Subsequently, he appeared in a supporting role as a maths prodigy in the critically acclaimed coming-of-age drama film X+Y, alongside Asa Butterfield and Sally Hawkins. He also starred as a young castrato in Virtuoso, a pilot produced for HBO by Alan Ball, but the show was not picked up by the network. He returned to the theatre doing various small productions in London during this period, playing a sexually precocious young gay man in The Glass Supper, and the lead in the post-apocalyptic Crushed Shells and Mud.

In 2016, he starred alongside Juliet Stevenson in his first lead film role, playing Elliot in the British film, Departure, the debut film of director Andrew Steggall, filmed in a mixture of French and English.

2016–present: Black Mirror, The End of the F***ing World, and wider recognition 
In 2016, Lawther played the main character Kenny in "Shut Up and Dance", an episode from series three of the British science fiction anthology series Black Mirror. While the episode overall received mixed reviews, and Lawther himself later expressed lukewarm feelings for the episode, he received universal acclaim and significant recognition for his performance. He also performed in the mockumentary film Carnage, directed by his frequent collaborator, comedian Simon Amstell.

In 2017, Lawther played Tibby Schlegel in Howards End, a BBC One adaptation of the E.M. Forster novel that starred Hayley Atwell, as well as the lead role of Billy Bloom in Trudie Styler's Freak Show, where he was supported by Bette Midler, Abigail Breslin, AnnaSophia Robb, Lorraine Toussaint and Larry Pine. Freak Show marked his first (and thus far only) appearance in an American film; Lawther has expressed a lack of interest in performing in more American films.

Later that same year, he also starred, alongside Jessica Barden, as James in the Peabody Award-winning television series The End of the F***ng World. The role also brought Lawther more acclaim from critics and further raised his profile in the entertainment industry. He would go on to reprise this role during the show's second and final season, which received a BAFTA Award for Best Drama. He also originated the role of Sam in the Stephen Daltry-directed play The Jungle, which focused on the refugee crisis in Calais, in both its London and New York productions. Lawther spent time in France meeting with refugees for this job, and ultimately found it to be one of his most challenging roles due to his character's right-wing views which were antithetical to his own. Subsequently, Lawther played the lead role of Amberson in Toby MacDonald's debut film Old Boys, as well as a supporting role in the horror film Ghost Stories.

In 2020, Lawther played the lead role in Régis Roinsard's thriller, Les Traducteurs (The Translators), his first non-English language film. As a result of fans of both Lawther and English singer-songwriter Declan McKenna frequently pointing out their resemblance, Lawther made an appearance in the music video for McKenna's song "The Key to Life on Earth".  In 2021, Lawther appeared in Ridley Scott's The Last Duel, Wes Anderson's The French Dispatch, and Lucile Hadzihalilovic's Earwig. He starred as Ariel in a French production of Shakespeare's The Tempest at Les Bouffes du Nord directed by Peter Brook and Marie-Hélène Estienne and replaces Andrew Scott in the titular role of Hamlet when Robert Icke's adaptation is brought to New York City, after previously being delayed due to the COVID-19 pandemic. He appeared in the Star Wars spin-off series Andor as rebel operative Karis Nemik.

Directing 
In 2021, Lawther made his directorial debut with the music video for "Fountainhead" by Linus Fenton, starring Roman Griffin Davis and sponsored by CALM. In 2022, he wrote and directed the short film "For people in trouble", produced by Ben Affleck and Matt Damon and starring Emma D'Arcy and Archie Madekwe.

Personal life 
Lawther stopped using social media as he began to take more high-profile roles and considers himself to be "technophobic". He has described himself as politically left-wing, and generally tries to avoid discussing his private life when possible. He considers his biggest inspirations as an actor to be Ben Whishaw, Sally Hawkins, and Andrew Scott.

Lawther has been a Francophile and a fan of French cinema from a young age. He speaks fluent French and divides his time between Paris and London.

Activism 
In 2020, Lawther co-signed an open letter to the government of the United Kingdom to ban conversion therapy for LGBT youth. He has also been involved in climate activism with Extinction Rebellion. He is a feminist and has critiqued the lack of diversity in the film industry. He became involved with causes supporting refugees following his work in The Jungle and supports the charity Choose Love.

Recognition
After seeing a sixteen-year-old Lawther's West End debut in South Downs, Dame Maggie Smith reportedly remarked to him that "most of us spend our lives trying to do what you've achieved". For that same performance, he was nominated for a WhatsOnStage Award for "Best Newcomer" and named one of London's "Top 25 Under 25" by the Evening Standard. He has since received the London Film Critics' Circle Award for "Young British Performer of the Year" for The Imitation Game for and the Dublin Film Critics Award for "Best Actor" for Departure. With the cast and crew of The Jungle, he received a Special Citation at the Obie Awards for the play's off-off-Broadway production and was cited for his "deeply funny and moving performance" in The End of the F***ing World when the show received a Peabody Award.

Lawther was named as one of BAFTA's Breakthrough Brits for 2015. His acting style has been compared favourably to actor Ben Whishaw, whom he cites as an idol of his.

Filmography

Film

Television

Stage

Radio

Podcasts

Music videos

Awards and nominations

References

External links
 
 An actor on the rise – Alex Lawther at The Glass Magazine

English male film actors
Living people
People educated at Churcher's College
21st-century English male actors
English male television actors
English male stage actors
1995 births
National Youth Theatre members
Male actors from Hampshire
British LGBT rights activists
Climate activists
People from Petersfield
British expatriates in France
British male television actors
British male stage actors
British television actors
People from the London Borough of Southwark
English male child actors